Miriam Meyerhoff (born 1964) is a New Zealand sociolinguist. In 2020 she was appointed as a senior research fellow at All Souls College, Oxford.

Early life and family
Meyerhoff was born in 1964, the daughter of poet Mary Cresswell and philosopher . Her father died in a car accident the following year, and her mother married logician Max Cresswell in 1970. The family subsequently moved to New Zealand.

Academic career
Meyerhoff completed a Master of Arts degree at Victoria University of Wellington, and, in 1997, a PhD at the University of Pennsylvania. Her PhD supervisor was Gillian Sankoff. Meyerhoff has held faculty positions at the University of Hawaii at Manoa, the University of Edinburgh, the University of Auckland, and Victoria University of Wellington. In 2020, Meyerhoff was appointed a senior research fellow at All Souls College, University of Oxford.

Meyerhoff's research examines the sociolinguistic constraints on variation, principally in communities characterised by language or dialect contact. Much of her work since her dissertation has been on Creoles, as their (typical) lack of standardisation leads to variation and change at all levels of linguistic structure.

She is the author of a well-regarded introductory textbook on sociolinguistics (Meyerhoff 2018).

Meyerhoff has spoken to media on linguistic issues, including: whether New Zealand speech is affected by migration patterns and diversity; the use of the word eh in New Zealand English; and the impact of digital technology on communication.

Honours 

In 2020, Meyerhoff was inducted as a Fellow of the Linguistic Society of America.

In 2017, she was elected a fellow of the Royal Society Te Apārangi.

Publications
  According to WorldCat, the book is held in 811 libraries. 
  According to WorldCat, the book is held in 511 libraries in 40 editions.
 
 
 
 
 Meyerhoff, Miriam. 2018. Introducing Sociolinguistics. Routledge. ISBN 9781138185593

References

External links
 google scholar 
 linked-in
 institutional homepage
 institutional homepage

1964 births
Living people
New Zealand women academics
Sociolinguists
Linguists from New Zealand
University of Pennsylvania alumni
Cornell University faculty
Academic staff of the University of Auckland
New Zealand writers
New Zealand women writers
Women linguists
Fellows of the Royal Society of New Zealand
Fellows of the Linguistic Society of America